Zambon is a surname. Notable people with the surname include:
  (born 1996): French racing cyclist
 Francis Zambon, birth name of songwriter Mark James
 Jules Zambon (born 1938), Luxembourgish footballer
 Maria Zambon, British virologist
 Rosanna Zambon (born 1950), Italian singer